Samuel Sawaji Green Jr. (born January 5, 1990) is a Japanese American professional basketball player who last played for the Yokohama Excellence of the B.League in Japan.
He was selected by the Akita Northern Happinets with the 14th overall pick in the 2012 bj League draft.

Career statistics

Regular season  

|-
| align="left" | 2012–13
| align="left" | Akita
| 9 || 1 || 3 || .778|| – || .500 || 0.9 || 0.2 || 0.1 || 0 ||  1.8
|-
| align="left" | 2013–14
| align="left" | Osaka
| 22 || 1 || 10.4 || .529 || – || .400 || 1.6 || 0.2 || 0.5 || 0 ||  3.7
|-
| align="left" | 2013–14
| align="left" | Tokyo CR
| 16 || 9 || 12.6 || .400 || .000 || .286 || 3.1 || 0.6 || 0.4 || 0 ||  3.4　
|-
| align="left" | 2014–15
| align="left" | Gunma
| 42 || || 6.6 || .592|| .000 || .700 || 1.5 || 0.3 || 0.1 || 0 ||  2.2
|-
| align="left" | 2015–16
| align="left" | Toyama
|31 || ||4.6 ||.377 ||.143 ||.600 ||.8 ||.2 ||.1 ||.0 ||1.9
|-
| align="left" | 2016–17
| align="left" | Iwate
| 50||2 ||7.6 ||.465 || ||.621 ||1.6 ||.3 ||.1 || .0|| 2.2
|-
| align="left" | 2017–18
| align="left" | Shiga
|20 || ||3.9 ||.421 ||.000 ||.500 || .5|| .1||.1 ||.0 ||0.8
|-
| align="left" | 2018–19
| align="left" | Saitama
|55 ||16 ||14.5 ||.460 ||.341 ||.726 ||2.8|| .7||.4 ||.0 ||5.5
|-
| align="left" | 2019–20
| align="left" | Tokyo CR
|27 ||8 ||18.7 ||.492 ||.275 ||.533 ||3.3|| 1.5||.5 ||.0 ||5.4
|-

Playoffs 

|-
|style="text-align:left;"|2015–16
|style="text-align:left;"|Toyama
| 5 ||   ||2.80  || .556   || 1.000 || .500 ||1.0 ||1.0 || 0|| 0 ||2.4
|-

References

1990 births
Living people
Akita Northern Happinets players
Gordon State College alumni
Gunma Crane Thunders players
Iwate Big Bulls players
Japanese men's basketball players
Japanese people of American descent
American men's basketball players
American people of Japanese descent
American sportspeople of Japanese descent
Osaka Evessa players
Saitama Broncos players
Shiga Lakes players
Sportspeople from Kanagawa Prefecture
Tokyo Cinq Rêves players
Tokyo Hachioji Bee Trains players
Toyama Grouses players